The Fremantle Football Club, nicknamed the Dockers, is a professional Australian rules football club competing in the Australian Football League (AFL), the sport's elite competition. The team was founded in 1994 to represent the port city of Fremantle, a stronghold of Australian rules football in Western Australia. The Dockers were the second team from the state to be admitted to the competition, following the West Coast Eagles in 1987. Both Fremantle and the West Coast Eagles are owned by the West Australian Football Commission (WAFC), with a board of directors operating Fremantle on the commission's behalf.

High-profile players who forged careers at Fremantle include All-Australian Matthew Pavlich, Hall of Fame inductee Peter Bell, and dual Brownlow Medal winner Nat Fyfe, who previously captained the club under both Ross Lyon and current head coach Justin Longmuir. Originally based at Fremantle Oval, the club's training and administrative facilities are now located nearby at Cockburn ARC in Cockburn Central, whilst its home ground is the 60,000-capacity Perth Stadium in Burswood.  
 
Fremantle has also fielded a women's team in the AFL Women's league since the competition's inception in 2017. They were coached by Trent Cooper and captained by Hayley Miller in 2022. Their most successful season was the 2020 season, in which the team was undefeated, but was ultimately cancelled without a premiership awarded due to the COVID-19 pandemic.

Australian rules football in Fremantle

The port city of Fremantle, Western Australia has a rich footballing history, hosting the state's first organised game of Australian rules in 1881. Fremantle's first teams, the Fremantle Football Club, the Union/Fremantle Football Club and East Fremantle Football Club, dominated the early years of the West Australian Football League (WAFL), winning 24 of the first 34 premierships. Since 1897, Fremantle Oval has been the main venue for Australian rules football matches in the city. Until the opening of Perth Stadium in 2018, the record attendance for an Australian rules football game in Western Australia stood at 52,781 for the 1979 WANFL Grand Final between East Fremantle and South Fremantle at Subiaco Oval.

Champion footballers who forged careers playing for Fremantle-based clubs include, among other Australian Football Hall of Fame inductees, Steve Marsh, Jack Sheedy, John Todd, George Doig, William Truscott and Bernie Naylor.

History

Early years (1993–2006)

Negotiations between East Fremantle and South Fremantle to enter into the VFL as a merged club began in 1987. However, due to an exclusive rights clause granted to the West Coast Eagles this would be impossible until the end of the 1992 season. Further applications were made by the clubs to join but their model was out of favour with the West Australian Football Commission.

The AFL announced on 14 December 1993 that a new team, to be based in Fremantle, would enter the league in 1995, with the tentative name of "Fremantle Sharks." The licence cost $4 million. The names "Fremantle Football Club", "Fremantle Dockers" and the club colours of purple, red, green and white were announced on 21 July 1994. The decision to base the new club in Fremantle was primarily due to the long history of Australian rules football in Fremantle. However, it was not represented in a national club competition until 1995, eight years after the first expansion of the then Victorian Football League into Western Australia in 1987 with the creation of the West Coast Eagles. Their first training session was held on 31 October 1994 at Fremantle Oval.

The team endured some tough years near the bottom of the premiership ladder, until they finished fifth after the home and away rounds in 2003 and made the finals for the first time. The elimination final against eighth-placed Essendon at Subiaco Oval was then the club's biggest ever game, but ended in disappointment for the home team, with the finals experience of Essendon proving too strong for the young team. They then missed making the finals in the following two seasons, finishing both years with 11 wins, 11 losses and only 1 game outside the top eight.

After an average first half to the 2006 AFL season, Fremantle finished the year with a club-record nine straight wins to earn themselves third position at the end of the home and away season with a club-best 15 wins. In the qualifying final against Adelaide at AAMI Stadium, the Dockers led for the first three-quarters before being overrun by the Crows. The following week saw the club win its first finals game in the semi-final against Melbourne at Subiaco Oval. The club subsequently earned a trip to Sydney to play in its first ever preliminary final, where they lost by 35 points at ANZ Stadium to the Sydney Swans.

Recent history (2007–present)
In 2007, following Chris Connolly's resignation midway through the season, Mark Harvey, a three-time premiership player with Essendon, was appointed caretaker coach for the club. During his seven matches for 2007, Harvey coached the Dockers to four wins and three losses. The club came 11th that year, and Harvey was appointed full-time coach at the end of the season. The following year saw the club slump to 14th.

In Round 15, 2009, Fremantle recorded the lowest score in its history and of the 2000s, scoring only 1.7 (13) to the Adelaide Crows' 19.16 (130). It scored just one point in the first half and the only goal scored came in the third quarter.

After finishing sixth in 2010, the club played in the finals for the first time since 2006. The team played Hawthorn at Subiaco Oval, and despite being considered underdogs, went on to win by 30 points. The win came from strong performances from Luke McPharlin and Adam McPhee who limited the impact of Lance Franklin and Luke Hodge, respectively. The team's second ever win in a finals match qualified them for a semi-final to be played against the Geelong Cats at the MCG the following week. In a one-sided contest, the Dockers lost by 69 points.

The 2011 season saw Fremantle lose just once in the first six rounds before ending the year in 11th position after losing their final seven games. Fremantle's collapse was considered a result of a heavy injury count that began in the pre-season.

In September 2011, Mark Harvey was sensationally sacked by the club in favour of still-contracted St Kilda coach Ross Lyon.

Fremantle qualified for the finals in 2012 after finishing in seventh position. In their elimination final against Geelong, the Dockers won their first ever finals game away from home with a 16-point victory at the MCG behind Matthew Pavlich's six goals. Fremantle subsequently lost to the Crows in Adelaide the following week, ending their finals campaign.

In 2013, Fremantle finished the home-and-away season in third position with a club-best 16 wins. In their qualifying final against the Cats in Geelong, the Dockers produced a first-round upset with a 15-point victory to advance through to a home preliminary final. In the preliminary final, the Dockers defeated the reigning premiers, the Sydney Swans, by 25 points to advance to their maiden AFL Grand Final. In the 2013 grand final, the Dockers were defeated by Hawthorn by a margin of 15 points.

In 2014, the club reached the finals for the third successive year with a top-four finish and 16 wins, but despite earning a double chance, they were knocked out after losses to Sydney away and Port Adelaide at home. Nat Fyfe was awarded the Leigh Matthews Trophy for winning the AFL Players' Association MVP award.

In 2015, the club were crowned minor premiers for the first time in their history, earning their first piece of silverware with the McClelland Trophy. However, the club failed to convert this into a grand final appearance, losing to Hawthorn by 27 points in its home preliminary final. Fremantle ended their season with Nat Fyfe becoming the club's first Brownlow Medalist.

Season 2016 marked Matthew Pavlich's final season in the AFL, as Fremantle missed the finals following a 10-game losing streak to start the year, finishing in 16th position with just four wins.

Ross Lyon was sacked as coach on 20 August 2019 after the club failed to qualify for the finals. He was replaced by Justin Longmuir.

Longmuir's first season was during the Covid 19 affected 2020 AFL season which was shortened from 22 matches to 17.  Fremantle would lose their first four games before finding form and finish 12th on the ladder with 7 wins and 10 losses.

The 2022 AFL season would prove to be a breakout year for the Dockers who qualified for finals for the first time since the 2015 AFL season and were in contention for a top 4 finish throughout the season before finishing fifth with fifteen wins six losses and one draw. Fremantle's return to finals saw them play the Western Bulldogs in an elimination final at Optus Stadium. Fremantle were dominated in the early stages of the game with the Bulldogs holding a 42-1 point lead at the nine minute mark of the second term. Fremantle would go on to kick 11 of the last 13 goals to win the game by 13 points. Fremantle next faced Collingwood in a semi-final at the MCG in front of a crowd of over 90,000, losing the game by 20 points.

Performance
After struggling in their early start up years, Fremantle are beginning to be a more established and consistently more competitive club in the AFL, with an overall win percentage of 50.0% since first making the finals in 2003. The Dockers' halcyon years took place between 2013 and 2015, where they earned three-straight top four finishes to go with their only grand final appearance (2013) and their only minor premiership (2015).

Fremantle played in its first drawn match in Round 8, 2013 against the Sydney Swans. In 2006, against St Kilda at Aurora Stadium in Launceston, they did play in a controversial Round 5 match that initially ended in a draw. However, the AFL overturned the draw result the following Wednesday after the match, due to an off-field error made by the timekeepers not sounding the siren for long enough, and declared Fremantle as one-point winners. It marked the first time a game result had been later overturned since 1900.

Year by year performance

Club identity

Nickname 

The club is nicknamed the "Dockers" in reference to Fremantle's history as a port city. Shortly after the club was launched in 1994, Levi Strauss & Co., which produces the Dockers brand of clothing, challenged the club's right to use the name "Fremantle Dockers", specifically on clothing. As a result, the club and the AFL discontinued the official use of the "Dockers" nickname in 1997. However, it remained in common usage both inside and outside the club, and continued to appear in the official team song "Freo Way to Go" and as the title of the official club magazine Docker. In October 2010, the strong association that members and fans have with the "Dockers" nickname led the club to form a new arrangement with Levi Strauss & Co which allows the club to officially use the nickname "Dockers" everywhere including on clothing and other brand elements. This name change was made in conjunction with changes to the club logo and playing strip.

Guernsey 

Until 2011 the Fremantle Football Club used the anchor symbol as the basis for all of their guernseys. The home guernsey was purple, with a white anchor on the front separating the chest area into red and green panels, representing the traditional maritime port and starboard colours. The colours also acknowledged Fremantle's large Italian community, which historically has been associated with the city's fishing community. The away or clash guernsey was all white with a purple anchor. Since the end of the 2010 home and away season, the home jumper is purple with three white chevrons, and the away jumper is white with purple chevrons.

One game each year is designated as the Purple Haze game, where an all-purple jumper with a white anchor is worn. This game is used to raise money for the Starlight Children's Foundation. After the guernsey re-design to a predominately purple home jumper, Fremantle wore the Starlight Foundation logo, a yellow star, above the highest chevron for their Purple Haze game.

Since 2003, the AFL has hosted an annual Heritage Round. Until 2006, Fremantle wore a white guernsey with three red chevrons, to emulate the jumper worn by the original Fremantle Football Club in 1885. However, in 2007, the selected round had Fremantle playing Sydney, who also wear red and white. An alternative blue and white striped design was used, based on the jumper worn by the East Fremantle Football Club in their 1979 WAFL Grand Final win over the South Fremantle Football Club. This Fremantle Derby held the record, prior to the opening of Optus Stadium, for the highest attendance at a football game of any code in Western Australia, with 52,781 attending at Subiaco Oval.

In September 2008, newly appointed CEO Steve Rosich confirmed that the Fremantle Football Club would undergo a thorough review of all areas, including the club's team name, song, guernsey, and logo in a bid to boost its marketability. However he later confirmed that the purple colour will be maintained as it had become synonymous with Fremantle.

Home ground and headquarters 

Fremantle Football Club had its original training and administration facilities at Fremantle Oval from 1995 until 2017. On 21 February 2017 the club moved its training and administration facilities to Cockburn ARC, a professional sports training facility and community recreation centre that was constructed in 2015–17 at a price of $109 million, located in the suburb of Cockburn Central.

The team's home games are played at Optus Stadium, a 61,000 seat multi-purpose stadium located in the suburb of Burswood. The club began playing home matches at the venue in 2018, having previously played home matches at Subiaco Oval from 2001 onward and before that the WACA Ground from 1995 to 2000.

Songs 
The official song of Fremantle is "Freo Way to Go", a truncated version of the club's original song, "Freo Heave Ho", written by Ken Walther. "Freo Way to Go" was adopted in 2011 following a poll on the Dockers' official website, beating out three other newly composed songs, including "Freo Freo", written by Fremantle-based indie rock group and the Dockers' then-number one ticket holder, Eskimo Joe. The poll took place around the same time that the club's guernsey and logo were also updated.

Unlike other AFL team songs, "Freo Way to Go" is played to a contemporary rock tune. "Freo Heave Ho" also had a section based on Igor Stravinsky's arrangement of the traditional Russian folk song, "Song of the Volga Boatmen", which was dropped in 2011, leaving only the original composition of Walther.

Due to its unconventional style, the song is derided by many opposition supporters and defended with equally fierce loyalty by many fans. "Every other team song sounds like a 'Knees Up Mother Brown' from previous eras. We've got a backbeat", boasted author and Fremantle fan Tim Winton. In 2021, in response to being named the club's new number one ticket holder, Tame Impala frontman and Fremantle local Kevin Parker released a new Fremantle "pump up" track to be played at home games. Bolstering the Fremantle connection, the song draws inspiration from AC/DC.

Mascots 

1995–1999: Grinder – A cartoon-like docker man, in a similar style to Popeye, with a permanent snarl, oversized jaw and muscular arms.
2000–2003: The Doc – a straggly blonde-haired mascot, similar in appearance to Fremantle players Clive Waterhouse or Shaun McManus.
2003–present: Johnny "The Doc" Docker – a blonde haired surfer with a surfboard under one arm is the Docker's official mascot in the Mascot Manor promotion for kids. Jenny Docker is also a mascot of the Fremantle Football Club.

Ownership and management
The club is owned by the West Australian Football Commission (WAFC). Since 2003, a Board of Directors controls the operation of the club, on behalf of the WAFC.  Prior to this, a two-tier arrangement was in place, with a Board of Management between the board of directors and the commission.  The initial club chief executive officer was David Hatt, who had come from a hockey background, and the inaugural club chairman was Ross Kelly, who had played for West Perth.  It was a deliberate act by the commission to avoid having administrators from either East Fremantle or South Fremantle in key roles, as they wanted the club to be bigger than just representing Fremantle.
 
Kelly resigned at the end of 1998, replaced by Ross McLean.  Whilst he presided over some key financial decisions, including the building of the club's administrative and training centre at Fremantle Oval and the deferment of the licence fee to the AFL, it was Fremantle's lowest point onfield, culminating in a two-win season in 2001 which saw the coach Damian Drum be sacked mid-year.  McLean resigned following an inadvertent breach of the salary cap.

In early 2001 Hatt accepted a government job and Cameron Schwab was appointed.  After weathering the fallout from the disastrous 2001 season, Schwab and the new chairman, local West Australian retailing businessman Rick Hart, set about rebuilding the club.  A former recruiting manager, Schwab focused on building up the on-field performance by recruiting high-profile players in Trent Croad, Peter Bell and Jeff Farmer, as well as coach Chris Connolly and with Hart then focused on enhancing the corporate and financial standing of the club. The club membership grew every year from 2002 until 2008 and the final licence payment was made to the AFL in 2005.

Schwab chose to return to Melbourne in 2008 and was replaced as CEO by Steve Rosich, who had previously worked for the West Coast Eagles.  A year later Hart resigned as president and Steve Harris, who runs The Brand Agency and had produced advertising for Fremantle since 2002, took over at the end of 2009.  Harris had been on the board since November 2008, the first club chairman or president to have previously served on the board. The club has developed into one of the wealthiest clubs in the league and their surprise recruitment of Ross Lyon to replace Mark Harvey as coach at the end of the 2011 is seen as an example of their ruthless drive for sustained success. In 2014, Harris resigned as president and was replaced by the then vice president, Perth property developer Dale Alcock.

Sponsorship

Rivalries

Western Derby

Fremantle's biggest rivalry is with the other Western Australian team, the West Coast Eagles, who they play twice each year in the home and away season, in the fiercely contested "Western Derby" matches (Pronounced  in Western Australia). West Coast were victorious in the first nine games, before Fremantle won in round 16, 1999, after which has prompted a fairly even Derby result with Fremantle at 20 and West Coast at 21 Derby wins. The term "derby" is named after the Fremantle Derby games between East and South Fremantle in the West Australian Football League, which for almost 100 years have been considered some of the most important games in the local league. The 1979 WANFL Grand Final will forever hold the Subiaco Oval football attendance record of 52,781.

St Kilda controversies
The Dockers and the St Kilda Football Club have seen a number of controversial events between them, most notably the AFL siren controversy at York Park in 2006. The match was sent into a state of confusion with Fremantle leading by one point when the siren (which had not been very loud all game) was not heard by the umpires who then allowed St Kilda tagger Steven Baker to score a point after time had elapsed and, as a result, the match ended in a draw. The outcome of the game was taken to the AFL Commission and it was decided during the week that as the siren had gone Fremantle were judged to be the winners, disallowing Baker's point.

During the 2011 off-season, Fremantle sacked coach Mark Harvey and replaced him with then-St Kilda coach Ross Lyon in controversial circumstances. The move was met with much criticism towards Fremantle's president, Steve Harris, and CEO, Steve Rosich, claiming that they had "backstabbed" Harvey. Lyon was also met with widespread criticism and was accused of backstabbing St Kilda by many Saints supporters as the club was made aware that Fremantle had approached Lyon during St Kilda's lead-up to its finals campaign. The two clubs contested a highly anticipated Friday night match in Round 4 of the 2012 AFL season at Etihad Stadium, with Fremantle winning by 13 points and Lyon being booed throughout the match. Lyon has since become Fremantle's longest serving and most successful coach.

Players

Current squad
See also Fremantle Football Club drafting and trading history for the complete list of Fremantle's draft selections, delistings and trades

Covid top-up list

For the 2022 season, in the event an AFL club has less than 28 players availble due to Covid, each club can select from a list of 20 state league players who can be called up to AFL level.

Fremantle has selected 20 players from the WAFL

Leadership

Reserves team 
For most of Fremantle's history, players have played for various West Australian Football League (WAFL) teams when not selected to play for the Fremantle AFL team.  Players recruited from the WAFL have remained with their original club, and players recruited from interstate have been allocated to teams via a draft system.  Since the 2014 season, the Peel Thunder Football Club has served as the host club for the Fremantle Dockers, an arrangement which will see Fremantle's reserves players playing in the WAFL for Peel Thunder Football Club.  An attempt to field a standalone Fremantle reserves side in the WAFL was rejected by the other WAFL clubs. A similar host club system was used in 1999 when South Fremantle was the aligned club but was cancelled after a single season.

AFL Women's team

History

In May 2016, the club launched a bid to enter a team in the inaugural AFL Women's season in 2017. As part of the bid, the team would guarantee all players education and job opportunities with the club and the partnering Curtin University.

Fremantle beat out a bid from rivals  when they were granted a license on 15 June 2016.

Kiara Bowers and Kara Antonio were the club's first signings, unveiled along with the league's other 14 marquee players on 27 July 2016. A further 24 senior players and two rookie players were added to the club's inaugural list in the league's drafting and signing period.

Former South Fremantle assistant coach, Michelle Cowan was appointed the team's inaugural head coach in July 2016.

The club's initial bid outlined plans for a game each at Domain Stadium and at Curtin University's Bentley campus as well as up to two remaining matches held at the club training base in the city of Cockburn. The club eventually played two home games at Fremantle Oval, one at Domain Stadium and one in Mandurah. In 2018, the Dockers hosted the first football game at Perth Stadium but will play the remainder of their home games at Fremantle Oval.

The Dockers struggled in their inaugural season, only winning one of seven games and finishing seventh out of eight teams on the ladder. They fared slightly better in 2018, winning three matches, but again finished seventh on the ladder.

In 2019, Fremantle had their most successful season, losing only one game during the home and away matches to eventual premiers Adelaide and making the finals for the first time. The team, now coached by Trent Cooper and with Kiara Bowers making her long-awaited debut after two injury affect years, started the year with a high scoring victory over Melbourne in the opening round and then kicked their highest ever score, 10.7 (67), in round 2 against Brisbane. Despite having won two more games than Carlton, the controversial conference system saw Carlton host the knock out preliminary final and inflict Fremantle's second defeat of the year. In the post-season awards, Bowers and Dana Hooker came second behind Erin Phillips in the AFLW MVP award and AFL Women's best and fairest award respectively. Bowers, Hooker and Gemma Houghton were all named in the AFL Women's All-Australian team. Ashley Sharp was awarded goal of the year for a long run, multiple bounce goal.

Current squad

Season summaries

Source: AFLW History

Awards
The Doig Medal is the Fremantle Football Club's annual fairest and best award. Currently, the Fremantle coaching staff give every player votes on a 5, 4, 3, 2, 1 basis after every match, including Finals Series matches. Top votes are awarded for what is regarded as an elite performance. At the end of the year the votes are tallied and the Doig Medal Night is held to announce the winner. Variations on the voting system have been used in past years. The awards ceremony has been held at the Fremantle Passenger Terminal (1995), Challenge Stadium (1998–1999), Fremantle Oval (2000–2001), the Grand Ballroom at Burswood Entertainment Complex (2002–2005, 2008–current) and the Perth Convention Exhibition Centre (2006–2007).

The Beacon Award is presented to the club's best first year player. Mature aged recruits Michael Barlow, Tendai Mzungu and Lee Spurr have won in recent years, despite being significantly older than most first year players.

AFL Women's Awards

Records
Premierships: Nil
Grand Final appearances: 1 (2013)
 Minor Premierships: 1 (2015)
Wooden spoons: 1 (2001)
Finals series reached: Eight (2003, 2006, 2010, 2012, 2013, 2014, 2015, 2022)
Biggest winning margin: 113 points - 24.13 (157) vs. Greater Western Sydney 6.8 (44), Patersons Stadium, 11 August 2013 
Biggest losing margin: 133 points - 3.7 (25) vs. Geelong 24.14 (158), GMHBA Stadium, 18 August 2018
Longest winning streak: 9 games (Round 14, 2006 – Round 22, 2006) and (Round 1, 2015 - Round 9, 2015)
Longest losing streak: 18 games (Round 22, 2000 – Round 17, 2001)
Highest score: 28.12 (180) vs. Collingwood 10.8 (68), Subiaco Oval, 8 May 2005 
Lowest score: 1.7 (13) vs. Adelaide 19.16 (130), AAMI Stadium, 11 July 2009

Individual awards and records

Australian Football Hall of Fame inductees: Peter Bell 2015, Matthew Pavlich 2022
Brownlow Medallists: Nat Fyfe 2015, 2019
AFL Women's best and fairest winner: Kiara Bowers 2021
Norm Smith Medallists: None
Coleman Medallists: None
AFL Rising Star award: Paul Hasleby 2000; Rhys Palmer 2008; Caleb Serong 2020
All Australians: Matthew Pavlich 2002, 2003, 2005, 2006, 2007, 2008; Peter Bell 2003; Paul Hasleby 2003; Aaron Sandilands 2008, 2009, 2010, 2014; Luke McPharlin 2012; Michael Johnson 2013; Nat Fyfe 2014, 2015, 2019 (c); Hayden Ballantyne 2014; David Mundy 2015; Michael Walters 2019; Luke Ryan 2020; Andrew Brayshaw 2022
AFLW All-Australians: Kara Antonio 2017; Dana Hooker 2018, 2019; Ebony Antonio 2018; Gemma Houghton 2019, 2020; Kiara Bowers 2019, 2020, 2021; Janelle Cuthbertson 2021; Hayley Miller (vc) 2022
 22under22: Nat Fyfe 2013; Michael Walters 2013; Lachie Neale 2015; Sean Darcy 2018, 2020; Ed Langdon 2018; Adam Cerra 2020, 2021; Andrew Brayshaw 2020, 2021 (vc), 2022, (c); Hayden Young 2022; Jordan Clark 2022; Caleb Serong 2022;
 22under22 (AFLW): Roxanne Roux 2020; Sabreena Duffy 2020, 2021; Emma O'Driscoll 2021,2022
International rules representatives: Clive Waterhouse 1999; Matthew Pavlich 2002, 2003; Matthew Carr 2003; Paul Hasleby 2003; Robbie Haddrill 2004; Heath Black 2005; Ryan Crowley 2006; David Mundy 2006, 2015; Brett Peake 2006; Roger Hayden 2008; Garrick Ibbotson 2010; Paul Duffield 2010; Hayden Ballantyne 2015; Nat Fyfe 2017
Leigh Matthews Trophy (AFLPA Most Valuable Player) winners: Nat Fyfe 2014, 2015; Andrew Brayshaw 2022 
AFLPA Best First Year Player Award winners: Paul Hasleby 2000; Rhys Palmer 2008; Michael Barlow 2010; Caleb Serong 2020
AFLCA Best Young Player Award winners: Stephen Hill 2010; Nat Fyfe 2011
Most games: David Mundy, 376 games (as of 2022 season)
Most consecutive games: Matthew Pavlich, 160 games (Rd 15 2001 – Rd 16 2008)
Most goals: Matthew Pavlich, 700 goals (as of 2020 season)
Most goals in a season: 72 Matthew Pavlich, 2007
Most goals in a game: 10 Tony Modra vs Melbourne, Rd 10 1999, MCG
Mark of the Year winners: Tony Modra 2000; Luke McPharlin 2005
Goal of the Year winners: Winston Abraham 1996; Hayden Ballantyne 2011; Caleb Serong 2021
Goal of the Year (AFLW) winners: Ashley Sharp 2019

Attendance records
Record attendance (home and away game): 57,375, Round 20, 5 August 2018 at Perth Stadium v West Coast
Record attendance (AFLW home and away game): 41,975, Round 2, 10 February 2018 at Perth Stadium v Collingwood  
Record attendance (home game): 56,521, Round 6, 29 April 2018 at Perth Stadium v West Coast
Record attendance (finals match): 100,007, Grand Final, Sept 28, 2013 at MCG v Hawthorn.

Fremantle Football Hall of Legends
The Fremantle Football Hall of Legends was inaugurated by Fremantle Football Club in 1995, in recognition of the new AFL team's links with its home city's football heritage. The inductees are nominated by the two clubs from the Fremantle area in the WAFL: East Fremantle and South Fremantle. In time, players who represented Fremantle in the AFL will join their predecessors in this prestigious Hall.

Fremantle's 25 Since '95
In 2019, The West Australian named Fremantle's greatest team of the past twenty five years as part of the club's twenty fifth anniversary celebrations, as voted by Fans and club officials.:

Supporters

Number-one ticket holders

It is traditional for each AFL club to recognise a prominent supporter as the number-one ticket holder. Fremantle originally chose to award this to Carmen Lawrence, the sitting member for the federal seat of Fremantle. This was roundly criticised as the member may or may not be a supporter of the club and unnecessarily linked politics with sport. The policy was soon changed to select a well-known Fremantle identity for a two-year period.

On 23 April 2010, Eskimo Joe were announced as Fremantle's number-one ticket holder, replacing golfer Nick O'Hern. The band's drummer and guitarist, Joel Quartermain, hinted that they might write a new theme song for the club, saying that 

Other high-profile fans include current and former Premiers of Western Australia, Mark McGowan and Alan Carpenter, former Federal Minister of Defence, Stephen Smith, Tim Minchin, members of psychedelic rock band Tame Impala, author Tim Winton, American tennis player John Isner  and journalists and television presenters Dixie Marshall, Simon Reeve and Matt Price, who wrote a book on Fremantle, Way to Go.

Membership base 

Despite a relative lack of on-field success, Fremantle has recorded membership figures above average for the league.
The club in 2005 had the fastest growing membership in the AFL competition with home crowds growing at a similar rate. The club's recent membership slogans have emphasised the passion of Fremantle fans for their team.

Patrons
From 2003 until 2011, the Fremantle Football Club had the Governors of Western Australia as its patron.
2003–2005: John Sanderson
2006–2021: Ken Michael
2021–: Richard Walley
Vice-patrons
David Malcolm – Chief Justice of the Supreme Court of Western Australia (retired)
Syd Corser
Con Regan and Beryl Regan
Steve Marsh
Jack Sheedy

Honours

See also

List of Fremantle players (alphabetical)
List of Fremantle Dockers league players (ordered by debut)
Australian rules football in Western Australia
Fremantle Football Club drafting and trading history
Sport in Australia
Sport in Western Australia

References

Citations

Sources

External links

 
Australian Football League clubs
Sport in Fremantle
Australian rules football clubs established in 1994
Australian rules football clubs in Western Australia
1994 establishments in Australia
Sporting clubs in Perth, Western Australia
AFL Women's clubs